Classic Sinatra II is a 2009 compilation album by Frank Sinatra, that consists 21 tracks he recorded from Capitol Records.

Track listing
 "Something's Gotta Give" (Johnny Mercer) - 2:39
 "Too Marvelous for Words" (Mercer, Richard Whiting) - 2:28
 "Love and Marriage" (Sammy Cahn, Jimmy Van Heusen) - 2:38
 "From This Moment On" (Cole Porter) - 3:53
 "(Love Is) The Tender Trap" (Cahn, Van Heusen) - 	2:57
 "I Get Along Without You Very Well (Except Sometimes)" (Hoagy Carmichael, Jane Brown Thompson) - 3:42
 "All of Me" (Gerald Marks, Seymour Simons) - 2:07
 "I Thought About You" (Van Heusen, Mercer) - 2:29
 "Moonlight in Vermont" (Jack Blackburn, Karl Suessdorf) - 3:33
 "High Hopes" (Cahn, Van Heusen) - 2:42
 "Learnin' The Blues" (Dolores Silvers) - 3:02
 "Here's That Rainy Day" (Van Heusen, Johnny Burke) - 3:34
 "Pennies from Heaven" (Arthur Johnston, Burke) - 2:43
 "I've Got a Crush on You" (George Gershwin, Ira Gershwin) - 2:17
 "Guess I'll Hang My Tears Out to Dry" (Jule Styne, Cahn) - 4:00
 "Memories of You" (Andy Razaf, Eubie Blake) - 2:54
 "Love is Here to Stay" (G. Gershwin, I. Gershwin) - 2:40
 "(Ah, the Apple Trees) When the World Was Young" (Mercer, M. Philippe-Gerard, Angele Marie T. Vannier) - 3:47
 "Just One of Those Things" (Porter) - 3:14
 "Angel Eyes" (Matt Dennis, Tom Adair) - 3:48
 "This Can't Be Love" (Previously unreleased) (Richard Rodgers, Lorenz Hart) - 1:40

See also
 Classic Sinatra: His Greatest Performances 1953-1960 (2000)

References

2009 compilation albums
Frank Sinatra compilation albums
Capitol Records compilation albums